Wang Ying (1895 – November 4, 1950) was a Chinese bandit and minor Japanese puppet warlord from western Suiyuan. He was involved in the Chahar People's Anti-Japanese Army in 1933, commanding a formation called the 1st Route.  Following the suppression of the Anti-Japan Allied Army, Wang Ying went over to the Japanese Kwantung Army and persuaded them to let him recruit unemployed Chinese soldiers in Chahar Province. He returned to Japanese-occupied Northern Chahar with enough men to form two Divisions that were trained by Japanese advisors. By 1936 Wang was commander of this Grand Han Righteous Army attached to the Inner Mongolian Army of Teh Wang.

Following the failure of their first Suiyuan campaign, the Japanese used the Grand Han Righteous Army to launch another attempt to take eastern Suiyuan in January 1937. Fu Zuoyi routed Wang’s army, and it suffered heavy losses.

After 1937 he was able to establish a small puppet army, independent of Mengjiang, in Western Suiyuan under Japanese protection. His Self Government Army of Western Suiyuan in 1943 consisted of over 2300 men in three divisions, in a March 1943 British intelligence report.

After the Surrender of Japan, Wang Ying surrendered to Fu Zuoyi, and was appointed Commander of the 1st Cavalry Group. He was then made Commander of the 14th Cavalry Column, the 12th War Area. In 1946 he was appointed senior staff officer of the Beiping Camp for the Chairperson of the Military Committee. After that, he held the Supreme Commander of the Military for Subjugation Communists, the Route of Ping-Pu.

After the establishment of the People's Republic of China, Wang Ying was arrested. He was convicted of treason and anti-revolution and sentenced to death by the Beijing People's Court on May 23, 1950. He appealed to the Supreme People's court, but the court affirmed the original judgement. He was executed by firing squad in Beijing on November 4, 1950.

See also 
Hanjian
Second Sino-Japanese War

Notes

Sources 
 Jowett, Phillip S., Rays of The Rising Sun, Armed Forces of Japan’s Asian Allies 1931-45, Volume I: China & Manchuria, 2004. Helion & Co. Ltd., 26 Willow Rd., Solihull, West Midlands, England.
 International Military Tribunal for the Far East, Chapter 5: Japanese Aggression Against China
 中国抗日战争正面战场作战记 (China's Anti-Japanese War Combat Operations)
 Guo Rugui, editor-in-chief Huang Yuzhang
 Jiangsu People's Publishing House
 Date published : 2005-7-1
 
 Online in Chinese: http://www.wehoo.net/book/wlwh/a30012/A0170.htm
 
  from the Special Edition of  Literary&Historical Materials Vol.15 (文史资料选辑 第15辑)

1895 births
1950 deaths
Military personnel of the Republic of China in the Second Sino-Japanese War
Chinese anti-communists
Executed Chinese collaborators with Imperial Japan
Republic of China warlords from Hebei
Politicians from Xingtai
Executed People's Republic of China people
20th-century executions by China
People executed by China by firing squad
Executed people from Hebei